Peter Andrew Beardsley MBE (born 18 January 1961) is an English football coach and former footballer who played as a forward or midfielder between 1979 and 1999. 

In 1987, he set a record transfer fee in the English game and represented his country 59 times between 1986 and 1996, once as captain, taking part in two FIFA World Cups (1986 and 1990) and UEFA Euro 1988. At club level, he played for Newcastle United, Liverpool and Everton with stints with the Toffees and Magpies resulting in over 200 Premier League appearances. Over the course of his career he also had spells with Carlisle United, Manchester United, Vancouver Whitecaps, Bolton Wanderers, Manchester City, Fulham, Hartlepool United and the Melbourne Knights. 

Between 2001 and 2018 he worked in various coaching roles at Newcastle United, varying from the first team to the youth academy. In 2010, he was briefly appointed as the caretaker manager.

Club career

Early career
As a youth player, Beardsley played for Wallsend Boys Club in North Tyneside before joining Newcastle United. In 1977 Beardsley joined fellow former Wallsend Boys Club player Steve Bruce for a trial with Third Division club Gillingham. Although Gillingham signed Bruce as an apprentice, they turned Beardsley away. He also had unsuccessful trials with Burnley and Cambridge United.

Beardsley eventually began his professional career with Carlisle United in 1978. He managed 22 goals in 104 league games, helping them win promotion to the Second Division at the end of the 1981–82 season.

During 1982–83, he also spent time at Canadian club Vancouver Whitecaps and Manchester United, although his period at United was unsuccessful, making only one single appearance in a League Cup tie against AFC Bournemouth, and otherwise failing to break into the first team. Eventually, in September 1983 he was signed back to Newcastle United.

Newcastle United
Beardsley signed for Newcastle for a fee of £150,000, although when they had let him go earlier they could have signed him for nothing. He made his debut for the Magpies the day after he signed, 24 September, in the 1–1 Division 2 draw with Barnsley at Oakwell. Beardsley was an instant hit with the Newcastle supporters, scoring and setting up spectacular goals. He went on to celebrate promotion with his teammates, who were captained by Kevin Keegan in his final season as a player. They finished in the final promotion spot behind winners Chelsea and runners-up Sheffield Wednesday. He scored 20 league goals that season and formed an exciting strike partnership with former England striker Keegan, who had also won major honours with Liverpool.

Beardsley scored his first goal for the Magpies on 19 October 1983 in their 2–0 victory over Cardiff City at Ninian Park. His first goals at St James' Park came in Newcastle's next fixture, against Manchester City. United beat City 5–0 and Beardsley scored his first ever hat-trick.

In his first season in the First Division, Beardsley scored 17 goals in 38 league games as Newcastle finished in 14th position. These included a hat-trick on New Year's Day in a 3–1 home win over local rivals Sunderland, who finished the season relegated.

During the following campaign he played in all of Newcastle's 42 league matches, scoring 19 goals. In one fixture against West Ham United, Beardsley ended the game as a stand-in goalkeeper. The game ended in an 8–1 defeat for Newcastle, with Beardsley conceding the last three goals.

After returning from the 1986 World Cup, Beardsley helped a struggling Newcastle to avoid relegation in the 1986–87 season, eventually finishing 17th. He scored just five goals in 36 appearances that season, winning a further six caps for his country, before Liverpool manager Kenny Dalglish made a national record £1.9 million offer to Newcastle for Beardsley's services. Manager Willie McFaul accepted the offer and Beardsley was on his way to Merseyside after four seasons on Tyneside which had brought a total of a 61 goals (all in the league), his transfer completed on 14 July 1987.

12 years later, Manchester United manager Alex Ferguson revealed in his autobiography that he had made a £2 million bid for Beardsley, but McFaul had rejected the offer and told him that he wouldn't sell the player even if Ferguson offered £3 million.

Liverpool
Beardsley joined Liverpool at the same time as John Barnes, the Watford winger. They were added to John Aldridge, who had signed during the previous campaign, with the three playing against Arsenal on Beardsley's debut at Highbury on the opening day of the 1987–88 season, 15 August 1987. Aldridge scored after just nine minutes, Liverpool went on to win 2–1, and this shaped the rest of the season for the Reds. The new-look striker partnership of Beardsley and Aldridge took over from the long-standing partnership of Dalglish and Ian Rush, which was arguably the most successful partnership in English football during the 1980s. Rush had departed to Juventus of Italy, while player-manager Dalglish had decided only to make occasional first-team appearances from 1987 to 1988 onwards, finally retiring as a player in August 1990.

Beardsley's first goal for his new club came on 29 August 1987 in the 4–1 victory over Coventry City at Highfield Road, with Beardsley scoring in the 83rd minute. He helped Liverpool to a record-equalling 29 league matches undefeated as Liverpool convincingly strolled to the League title with just two defeats to their name. However, there was disappointment at the end when Wimbledon denied them the 'double' with a shock 1–0 win in the FA Cup final, a game in which Beardsley found the net, only for it to be ruled out by the referee who awarded Liverpool a free-kick for an earlier foul instead of allowing play to continue. Wimbledon scored the only goal of the game from a looping header by Lawrie Sanchez. John Aldridge missed a penalty for Liverpool in the second half.

Beardsley scored 15 league goals in his first season for Liverpool, level with John Barnes as the club's highest scorer behind John Aldridge.

Ian Rush rejoined the club in the 1988 close season and Liverpool returned to Wembley and won the FA Cup the following year, but lost their League championship with virtually the last kick of the last game of the season against Arsenal. Although Rush missed 14 games due to injury, when all three of Liverpool's strikers were fit, Dalglish played with a 4–3–3 formation that allowed Beardsley, Aldridge and Rush to play alongside each other when possible. Beardsley scored 11 league goals that season.

In April 1989, after the Hillsborough disaster claimed the lives of 97 Liverpool fans, Beardsley was among many Liverpool stars left distraught by the tragedy, attending several funerals and visiting the injured in hospital. He was part of the team that won the FA Cup that season with a 3–2 win over neighbours Everton at Wembley Stadium, though the league title slipped away on the final day of the season when Liverpool conceded a last minute goal to champions Arsenal at Anfield.

With the departure of John Aldridge a few weeks into the 1989–90 season, Dalglish reverted to a 4–4–2 formation with Beardsley and Rush as his main strikers, with Beardsley scoring 10 goals in 29 games.

Liverpool won the championship again that season, but the arrival of Israeli international striker Ronny Rosenthal saw his first-team opportunities limited in the title run-in, in which Liverpool overcame a strong challenge by Aston Villa to finish champions by a nine-point margin. Despite UEFA lifting the ban on English clubs in European competitions for the 1990–91 season, Liverpool were unable to compete in the European Cup as (being the team present at the Heysel disaster that had sparked the ban in 1985) they had to serve an extra year of the ban before being allowed to play in European competitions again.

Beardsley suffered another blow to his first team chances in January 1991 when Kenny Dalglish signed David Speedie. Dalglish stepped down the following month and was replaced a few weeks later by former Liverpool player Graeme Souness, after Ronnie Moran spent two months in charge on an interim basis. Beardsley managed 27 games that campaign and scored 11 goals – three of them in a 4–0 league win over Manchester United on 16 September 1990, and a further two in the Merseyside derby against Everton a week later.

Beardsley's final league goal for the Reds came on 17 November 1990, when he scored the only goal in a 1–0 win at Coventry City. By this relatively early stage of the season he had scored an impressive 11 times in the league, but a failure to add any more goals over the Christmas period may have played a part in Dalglish's decision to sign another striker in the new year.

His final competitive goals for Liverpool came in a dramatic fifth round FA Cup first replay against Everton at Goodison Park on 20 February 1991, which ended in a 4–4 draw and was the club's last game before the sudden resignation of manager Dalglish, who by the end of the season had been succeeded by Graeme Souness.

Liverpool were top of the league at this stage, but in the new year were overhauled by Arsenal and the title went to Highbury at the end of the season. And with the arrival of Dean Saunders for a national record fee of £2.9 million after the end of the season, Beardsley's days at Anfield were looking even more numbered, despite the sale of David Speedie.

During Beardsley's Anfield career he played in 175 matches and scored 59 goals, but it was his vision, guile and all action style of play that endeared him to the Anfield faithful, so much so he was voted in 19th position in the 2006 poll 100 Players Who Shook The Kop, conducted by the Liverpool Football Club web site; over 110,000 supporters worldwide voted for their 10 favourite players of all time.

Everton
Liverpool's derby rivals, Everton succeeded in gaining 30-year-old Beardsley's signature when he joined them on 5 August 1991 for a fee of £1 million. He made his debut on 17 August in a 2–1 defeat to Nottingham Forest at the City Ground. Beardsley scored 25 goals in 81 appearances for the blue half of Merseyside, though Everton did not achieve anything greater than a mid table finish in the league during his time there, and failed to make an impact in the cup competitions.

While at Everton he became – along with David Johnson – one of only two players to have scored for both sides in Merseyside derbies. He finished as the club's top scorer by the end of his first season at Goodison Park and again showed his dynamic quality during his second season, but off the field Everton were suffering financial difficulties and when former club Newcastle offered Everton £1.5 million for Beardsley, it was a sum they could not turn down for a 32-year-old player.

After 95 matches for Everton, scoring 32 goals, he returned to his home town club Newcastle.

Return to Newcastle United
On 16 July 1993, Beardsley rejoined Newcastle for £1.5 million, where his old teammate and strike partner Kevin Keegan was now manager. Newcastle had just won promotion to the Premier League as Division One champions, and in 1993–94 they finished third and qualified for the UEFA Cup, with Beardsley scoring a total of 25 goals and his strike-partner Andy Cole scoring a club record of 41 goals in all competitions. He played for a further four years at the club, almost captaining them to the Premier League title in 1996, but they were pipped to the title by Manchester United. They finished runners-up a year later as well, although 1996–97 was a trying season for the club as they failed to set the pace at the top of the table as they had the previous season, and halfway through the season Kevin Keegan had stunned the club with his resignation, with Kenny Dalglish then succeeding him.

During his second spell at St James's Park he racked up 157 appearances and scored 56 goals, bringing his overall total after two spells with the club to 321 appearances and 117 goals. This equates to a goal every 2.74 matches, a decent ratio for a player who was seen by many as a provider rather than a goalscorer, particularly in the 1996–97 season when he was switched to midfield following Alan Shearer's arrival. It is this period of his career that Beardsley regards as the time when he peaked.

Later career and retirement
Beardsley left Newcastle for the second time on 18 August 1997 for £450,000, joining Bolton Wanderers, where he made 21 appearances but was unable to save them from being relegated from the Premier League just one season after promotion. He then went on loan to Manchester City, where he played six times in Division One. This loan spell made Beardsley the only player to play for both top-flight teams in Liverpool and Manchester.

He then moved to Fulham who were managed by his former manager Keegan, where he made 28 appearances in two separate loan spells, eventually signing for them permanently. He then went to Hartlepool United on a free transfer, and played 22 times in Division Three to secure their Football League status.

He finally ended his career at the age of 38 when he played twice for the Melbourne Knights in Australia. In a professional career totalling some 20 years in English football, he managed 659 league games and 210 goals, and a total of 799 games and 238 goals in all competitions. He had collected three major trophies (all of them with Liverpool) and was capped 59 times by England, scoring nine times. He had also played in two promotion winning teams earlier in his career, although he had been sold by Carlisle just before they sealed promotion in 1982.

During the 2012–13 season, Beardsley played in a friendly for Cambridge United against the Newcastle United reserve squad to celebrate Cambridge's 100th anniversary since they were founded.

International career
After reaching the First Division with Newcastle, Beardsley became a regular in the England side in the second half of the 1980s, and teamed up with striker Gary Lineker, who described Beardsley as "the best partner I could ever have".

It was Lineker who made way for Beardsley when manager Bobby Robson gave him his debut as a substitute on 29 January 1986 in the 4–0 friendly victory over Egypt in Cairo. His first goal came in his fourth appearance, on 17 May 1986 in the 3–0 friendly win over Mexico in Los Angeles as England prepared for the forthcoming World Cup in Mexico.

Having only made his debut on 29 January 1986 in a 4–0 friendly win over Egypt, Beardsley's performances for England won him a call-up for the 1986 World Cup finals in Mexico. England scored seven goals in the tournament, of which Lineker scored six (winning the Golden Boot for doing so); the other goal came from Beardsley in a 3–0 victory over Paraguay in the second round. England had failed to score a goal in the first two matches of the finals, but in the third match – Beardsley's first start in the tournament – they beat Poland 3–0. Beardsley contributed in that match with a spectacular cross to Steve Hodge, which allowed Hodge to make England's second goal for Lineker. The next match was to be the famous Argentina vs. England, in which Diego Maradona scored twice for the 2–1 victory that left England out of the tournament. Beardsley played the full game and was one of the five players passed by Maradona for the "Goal of the Century".

He maintained his place in the England team and featured in both Euro 88 and the 1990 World Cup. He was named as England captain on 17 February 1988 when they drew 0–0 in a friendly with Israel.

Beardsley was dropped by England manager Graham Taylor after the end of 1990, around the same time he lost his regular place in the Liverpool line-up, and, controversially, continued to be overlooked by him despite England's disappointing performance at Euro 92 as well as their unsuccessful attempt to qualify for the 1994 World Cup. Beardsley, meanwhile, was performing very well for his new club Everton, having signed for them in August 1991, although Everton's form as a team was far from impressive.

During his second spell at Newcastle, Beardsley was recalled to the England team by new manager Terry Venables in early 1994 after an absence of three years, and ultimately ended his international career while still at Newcastle in 1996, when he was one of the three players dropped from the provisional squad of 25 for the final squad of 22 for Euro 96, along with Dennis Wise and Jason Wilcox, after gaining 59 caps and scoring nine goals.

Beardsley once scored four goals for England against Aylesbury United. These did not count towards his international tally, however, as this was not an official international match. Aylesbury became the only non-League side to face the full England team, as they hosted the national side in a warm-up match in 1988 in preparation for the European Championships. England won the game 7–0.

Coaching career
Beardsley joined the coaching staff at Newcastle United after his playing career was over. In early 1999, Beardsley also served as assistant manager to Howard Wilkinson during his first caretaker period as manager of England, between the dismissal of Glenn Hoddle and the appointment of Kevin Keegan. England faced – and lost to – world champions France in a friendly at Wembley. In 2003 Beardsley was the subject of a Premier League inquiry, after it was claimed that he had bullied two Newcastle United youth players. He was cleared of the charges. Bullying allegations were again raised against Beardsley in January 2018.

Beardsley left Newcastle United in 2006, when Glenn Roeder took over as permanent manager of the club. He believed Newcastle should go in a different direction. Beardsley then worked in a media role at the club. In 2007, his former boss at Everton Howard Kendall stated he was interested in taking over as manager of Republic of Ireland with Beardsley as his assistant manager. Beardsley was also linked with a return to Newcastle in January 2008 when Kevin Keegan returned as manager for a second spell.

In March 2009, Beardsley was re-appointed as an academy coach at Newcastle United, working primarily with young strikers. On 27 July 2010, he was appointed as Reserve Team Manager, with Steve Stone as his assistant manager. On 6 December 2010, following the dismissal of Chris Hughton, Beardsley was briefly placed in charge of the team on a temporary basis before Alan Pardew was brought in as Hughton's replacement.

In January 2018 Beardsley was placed on leave by Newcastle following allegations of racism. In March 2019, Newcastle confirmed that he had left the club, and the Football Association later confirmed they were investigating him. He was subsequently charged with three counts of using racist language to players. In September 2019 he was suspended from all football-related activity for 32 weeks after being found guilty by the FA of making racist comments to players. Beardsley said he was "surprised and disappointed" at being found guilty. The FA panel said: "Even if he did not intend to do so, he plainly did cause offence." However, the panel said it did not believe Beardsley was racist, stating: "We are satisfied that Mr Beardsley is not a racist in the sense of being ill-disposed to persons on grounds of their race or ethnicity."

Personal life
Born in Hexham, Beardsley grew up in Forest Hall, Newcastle upon Tyne.

Beardsley has been married since 1981 to his wife Sandra. They have a son, Drew (born 1989), and a daughter, Stacey (born 1993).

Career statistics

Club

Honours

Liverpool
Football League First Division: 1987-88, 1989–90
FA Cup: 1988–89
FA Charity Shield: 1988, 1989, 1990 (shared)

England
Rous Cup: 1986, 1988, 1989

Individual
Newcastle United Player of the Year: 1984–85, 1985–86
North-East FWA Player of the Year: 1986, 1994
PFA Team of the Year: 1986–87 First Division, 1987–88 First Division, 1989–90 First Division, 1993–94 Premier League
English Football Hall of Fame inducted in 2007

In popular culture
 
Beardsley lent his name to a video game in 1988: Peter Beardsley's International Football. 

Fictionalised versions of Beardsley and wife feature regularly in the podcast Athletico Mince, both portrayed by Bob Mortimer. This Beardsley enjoys staring, puffa-puffa jackets, chicken wraps and telling jokes while supporting his wife's insatiable appetite for eggs.

In the Red Dwarf episode "Better Than Life", he was mentioned as being a star in the fictional remake of Casablanca.

Notes and references

External links

Peter Beardsley profile Liverpool FC
Peter Beardsley profile LFCHistory.net
English Football Hall of Fame National Football Museum (Archived)

1961 births
Living people
Sportspeople from Hexham
1986 FIFA World Cup players
1990 FIFA World Cup players
Association football midfielders
Bolton Wanderers F.C. players
Carlisle United F.C. players
England international footballers
England B international footballers
English expatriate footballers
English expatriate sportspeople in Australia
English expatriate sportspeople in Canada
English footballers
English Football Hall of Fame inductees
Everton F.C. players
Expatriate soccer players in Australia
Expatriate soccer players in Canada
Fulham F.C. players
Hartlepool United F.C. players
Liverpool F.C. players
Manchester City F.C. players
Manchester United F.C. players
Melbourne Knights FC players
Members of the Order of the British Empire
National Soccer League (Australia) players
North American Soccer League (1968–1984) players
Newcastle United F.C. non-playing staff
Newcastle United F.C. players
Footballers from Newcastle upon Tyne
Premier League players
English Football League players
UEFA Euro 1988 players
Vancouver Whitecaps (1974–1984) players
Wallsend Boys Club players
Outfield association footballers who played in goal
FA Cup Final players
Footballers from Northumberland